USS Skipjack has been the name of more than one United States Navy ship named after the skipjack tuna, and may refer to:

USS Skipjack (Submarine No. 24), the original name of a submarine renamed  while under construction in 1911 and in commission from 1912 to 1921
, a submarine in commission from 1938 to 1946
, a submarine in commission from 1959 to 1990

United States Navy ship names